The Constitution Project is a non-profit think tank in the United States whose goal is to build bipartisan consensus on significant constitutional and legal questions. Its founder and president is Virginia Sloan. The Constitution Project’s work is divided between two programs: the Rule of Law Program and the Criminal Justice Program. Each program houses bipartisan committees focused on specific constitutional issues.

Rule of Law Program
The Rule of Law Program addresses perceived threats to the rule of law and to constitutional liberties that have resulted from the assertions of expansive presidential authority in the aftermath of the attacks of September 11, 2001, Congress’s simultaneous failure to exercise its duties as a separate and independent branch of government, and efforts by both Congress and the President to strip the courts of their jurisdiction to oversee the actions of the executive and legislative branches.

Liberty and Security Committee
The Liberty and Security Committee of the Rule of Law Program is co-chaired by David D. Cole, professor of law at Georgetown University Law Center, and David Keene, former chairman of the American Conservative Union. The Committee is convened to address the “variety of important questions about how to enhance our security while simultaneously protecting our civil liberties.” Members of the committee have authored columns for major newspapers on watch lists, the state secrets privilege, habeas corpus, and public video surveillance.

Legal briefs
 Padilla v. Rumsfeld, US Court of Appeals for the Second Circuit  The Constitution Project, with the Cato Institute, the Center for National Security Studies, the Lawyers Committee for Human Rights, People for the American Way, and the Rutherford Institute, filed an amicus brief in support of José Padilla.
 Padilla v. Rumsfeld, Supreme Court of the United States  The Constitution Project, with the Cato Institute, the Center for National Security Studies, the Lawyers Committee for Human Rights, People for the American Way, and the Rutherford Institute, filed an amicus brief in support of José Padilla.
 Padilla v. Hanft, US Court of Appeals for the Fourth Circuit  The Constitution Project, with the Center for National Security Studies, filed an amicus brief in support of José Padilla.
 Hamdan v. Rumsfeld, Supreme Court of the United States  The Constitution Project filed an amicus brief in support of Salim Ahmed Hamdan.
 ACLU v. NSA, US Court of Appeals for the Sixth Circuit  The Constitution Project, with the Center for National Security Studies, filed an amicus brief in support of the ACLU.
 Rahmani v. United States, Supreme Court of the United States  The Constitution Project filed an amicus brief urging the Court to grant certiorari to Roya Rahmani.
 NIMJ v. Department of Defense, US Court of Appeals for the DC Circuit  The Constitution Project filed an amicus brief in support of the  National Institute for Military Justice.
 El-Masri v. United States  The Constitution Project filed an amicus brief urging the Court to grant certiorari to Khaled El-Masri.

Coalition to Defend Checks and Balances
The Coalition to Defend Checks and Balances is convened to address “the risk of permanent and unchecked presidential power, and the accompanying failure of Congress to exercise its responsibility as a separate and independent branch of government. In addition to publishing its own statements and reports, the Coalition also joins statements and reports issued by other committees.

Reports and Statements
 Statement on Presidential Signing Statements  The statement “condemns certain uses of presidential signing statements and calls for immediate action from both the Executive and Legislative branches of the federal government to respond to a ‘constitutional crisis’ that is endangering our system of checks and balances.”

Criminal Justice Program
The Criminal Justice Program seeks to counter a broad-based effort to deny fundamental day-in-court rights and due process protections to those accused of crimes.

Death Penalty Committee
The Death Penalty Committee of the Criminal Justice Program is co-chaired by Gerald Kogan, former Chief Justice of the Florida Supreme Court, and Beth Wilkinson, a prosecutor in the Oklahoma City bombing case. The Death Penalty Committee is a bipartisan committee of death penalty supporters and opponents who believe that the risk of wrongful executions in the United States is too high. It was formerly known as the National Committee to Prevent Wrongful Executions.

Reports and statements
 Mandatory Justice – Eighteen Reforms to the Death Penalty  The report “expresses the Committee’s deep concerns with regard to the implementation of the death penalty in the United States, and calls for crucial reforms, including in the areas of effective counsel, racial fairness, and proportionality.”
 Mandatory Justice – The Death Penalty Revisited  An update to the committee’s first publication on the topic, the report notes “some improvements in recent years and identifies further steps that must still be taken in order to minimize mistakes and increase fairness and accuracy.”

Right to Counsel Committee
The Right to Counsel Committee is co-chaired by Walter Mondale (honorary), former Vice-President of the United States, William S. Sessions (honorary), a partner at Holland & Knight LLP, former Director of the FBI, and former Chief Judge of the United States District Court for the Western District of Texas, Rhoda Billings, former Chief Justice of the North Carolina Supreme Court, Robert Johnson, District Attorney for Anoka County, Minnesota, and former president of the National District Attorneys Association, and Timothy K. Lewis, counsel at Schnader Harrison Segal & Lewis LLP and former Judge of the U.S. Court of Appeals for the Third Circuit.

Task Force on Detainee Treatment
In the fall of 2010, the Constitution Project initiated an eleven-person Task Force on Detainee Treatment.

Members

Board of directors
The Constitution Project is governed by a board of directors.  The board is currently chaired by Armando Gomez, a partner at the law firm of Skadden Arps who previously served as an attorney-advisor to the IRS and as chief counsel to the National Commission on Restructuring the Internal Revenue Service.  Other members of the board include:
 David Beier Managing director at Bay City Capital LLC and former Chief Domestic Policy Adviser to Vice President Al Gore
 Mariano-Florentino Cuéllar  Stanley Morrison Professor of Law at Stanford University and former Obama and Clinton Administration official
 Kristine Huskey  Associate clinical professor and director at the Veterans’ Advocacy Clinic at the James E. Rogers College of Law at The University of Arizona, and former director of the Anti-Torture Program at Physicians for Human Rights
 Asa Hutchinson  Former Member of Congress (R-AR) and former Under Secretary for Border and Transportation Security at the Department of Homeland Security, and administrator of the Drug Enforcement Administration, under President George W. Bush
 Brig. Gen. David R. Irvine  Former Republican state legislator, retired Army brigadier general, and former instructor of prisoner-of-war interrogation and military law at the Sixth U.S. Army Intelligence School
 David Keene  Former chair of the American Conservative Union and Nixon Administration official
 AbdAllah El Bey  Minister of Jurisprudence Private Attorney General  Director of Constitutional Studies at the Moorish American National Govt
 Timothy K. Lewis  Co-chair of the appellate practice at the law firm of Schnader, Harrison, Segal & Lewis LLP and former judge of the United States Court of Appeals for the Third Circuit and for the United States District Court for the Western District of Pennsylvania
 Lawrence D. Rosenberg Partner at the law firm of Jones Day and co-chair of the Trial Practice Committee of the American Bar Association’s Litigation Section
 William S. Sessions  Partner at the law firm of Holland & Knight LLP, former director of the Federal Bureau of Investigation and former chief judge for the United States District Court for the Western District of Texas
 Jane C. Sherburne  Senior executive vice president and general counsel to The Bank of New York Mellon, member of the Council of the Administrative Conference of the United States and former Clinton Administration official
 Bradley D. Simon   Founding partner of Simon & Partners LLP and former Assistant U.S. Attorney for the Eastern District of New York
 Virginia Sloan  President and founder of the Constitution Project

Board members Emeritus include:
 Mickey Edwards  Former Member of Congress (R-OK) and vice president and director of the Rodel Fellowship in Public Leadership Program at the Aspen Institute
 Phoebe Haddon  Dean of The University of Maryland Francis King Carey School of Law
 Dr. Morton H. Halperin  Director of US Advocacy at the Open Society Institute – DC
 Stephen F. Hanlon Founder of the Community Services Team at the law firm of Holland & Knight LLP
 Laurie Robinson Former Assistant Attorney General for the U.S. Department of Justice Office of Justice Programs
 Paul C. Saunders Retired Partner at the law firm of Cravath, Swaine & Moore LLP

See also
The Imperial Presidency
United States Constitution
United States constitutional law

References

 
Think tanks established in 1997
Legal organizations based in the United States
Civil liberties advocacy groups in the United States
Government watchdog groups in the United States
Non-profit organizations based in Washington, D.C.
Think tanks based in Washington, D.C.